During the 2000–01 English football season, Bradford City competed in the Premier League. It was their second consecutive season in England's top flight, having retained their Premiership status on the last day of the previous season.

Season summary
The Bantams produced a promising start to the new season with a narrow 1–0 defeat at Anfield to Liverpool followed by a brilliant 2–0 home win over Chelsea in the first two games. However, that was as good as it got for the club and an overall-terrible start to the season saw inexperienced young manager Chris Hutchings dismissed after 12 games at the helm. In came Jim Jefferies as his successor, but Jefferies could do little to alter Bradford's dismal fortunes and they went down in bottom place with just five Premiership wins all season.

Bradford City made their first ever foray into European competition, competing in the UEFA Intertoto Cup. They reached the semi-finals before being knocked out by Russian club Zenit Saint Petersburg.

Kit
Bradford City retained the previous season's kit, manufactured by Japanese company ASICS and sponsored by Bradford-based car dealership JCT600.

Final league table

Results summary

Results by round

Results
Bradford City's score comes first

Legend

FA Premier League

FA Cup

League Cup

UEFA Intertoto Cup

First-team squad
Squad at end of season

Left club during season

Statistics

Appearances and goals

|-
! colspan=14 style=background:#dcdcdc; text-align:center| Goalkeepers

|-
! colspan=14 style=background:#dcdcdc; text-align:center| Defenders

|-
! colspan=14 style=background:#dcdcdc; text-align:center| Midfielders

|-
! colspan=14 style=background:#dcdcdc; text-align:center| Forwards

|-
! colspan=14 style=background:#dcdcdc; text-align:center| Players transferred out during the season

|}

Starting 11
Considering starts in all competitions
Considering a 4–3–3 formation

Transfers

In

Out

Transfers in:  £5,500,000
Transfers out:  £5,600,000
Total spending:  £100,000

Notes

References

External links
FootballSquads – Bradford City – 2000–01
Historical Bradford City kits

Bradford City A.F.C. seasons
Bradford City